Koleje Wielkopolskie (Polish for Greater Poland Railways; KW) is a regional rail operator in the Greater Poland Voivodeship of Poland. The company was founded on 29 September 2009 and is fully owned by the local government. Koleje Wielkopolskie began regular passenger services on 1 June 2011.

Railway services 
The company operates on the following lines:

  Poznań Główny – Kutno (Part of Poznań suburban rail Line  between Poznań Główny and  Września)
  Poznań Główny – Mogilno (Part of Poznań suburban rail Line  between Poznań Główny and  Gniezno)
  Poznań Główny – Gołańcz (Part of Poznań suburban rail Line  between Poznań Główny and  Wągrowiec)
  Poznań Główny – Piła (Part of Poznań suburban rail Line  between Poznań Główny and  Rogoźno)
  Piła - Wyrzysk Osiek
  Poznań Główny – Krzyż (Part of Poznań suburban rail Line  between Poznań Główny and  Wronki)
  Poznań Główny – Zbąszynek (Part of Poznań suburban rail Line  between Poznań Główny and  Nowy Tomyśl)
  Poznań Główny – Wolsztyn (Part of Poznań suburban rail Line  between Poznań Główny and  Grodzisk Wlkp.)
  Leszno – Zbąszynek
  Poznań Główny – Rawicz (Part of Poznań suburban rail Line  between Poznań Główny and  Kościan)
  Leszno – Ostrów Wlkp.
  Poznań Główny – Milicz (Part of Poznań suburban rail Line  between Poznań Główny and  Środa Wlk.)
  Poznań Główny – Odolanów (Part of Poznań suburban rail Line  between Poznań Główny and  Środa Wlk.)
  Poznań Główny – Kępno (Part of Poznań suburban rail Line  between Poznań Główny and  Środa Wlk.)
  Poznań Główny – Łódź Fabryczna (Part of Poznań suburban rail Line  between Poznań Główny and  Środa Wlk.) (Co-operated with LKA Łódź Railway)
  Poznań Główny – Kalisz (Part of Poznań suburban rail Line  between Poznań Główny and  Środa Wlk.)
  Gniezno - Krotoszyn

Fleet

References

External links

Greater Poland Voivodeship
Railway companies of Poland
Railway companies established in 2009
Polish Limited Liability Companies